The 1951 San Francisco Dons football team was an American football team that represented the University of San Francisco as an independent during the 1951 college football season. In their fourth season under head coach Joe Kuharich, the Dons compiled a 9–0 record, outscored opponents by a total of 338 to 86, and were ranked No. 14 in the final AP Poll.

Four players from the team went on to successful careers in the National Football League: Gino Marchetti, Ollie Matson, Bob St. Clair, and Red Stephens. The Dons were invited to play in the 1952 Orange Bowl on the condition that the team's African-American stars Matson and Burl Toler would not play. The Dons refused the offer.  The 1951 Dons, and their fight for racial equality, were the subject of the 2014 documentary '51 Dons.

Two days after the final game of the 1951 season, the University of San Francisco disbanded its football program.

Schedule

References

San Francisco
San Francisco Dons football seasons
College football undefeated seasons
San Francisco Dons football